In enzymology, a 2,3-dihydroxybenzoate 3,4-dioxygenase is an enzyme that catalyzes the chemical reaction

2,3-dihydroxybenzoate + O2  3-carboxy-2-hydroxymuconate semialdehyde

Thus, the two substrates of this enzyme are 2,3-dihydroxybenzoate and O2, whereas its product is 3-carboxy-2-hydroxymuconate semialdehyde.

This enzyme belongs to the family of oxidoreductases, specifically those acting on single donors with O2 as oxidant and incorporation of two atoms of oxygen into the substrate (oxygenases). The oxygen incorporated need not be derived from O2.  The systematic name of this enzyme class is 2,3-dihydroxybenzoate:oxygen 3,4-oxidoreductase (decyclizing). Other names in common use include o-pyrocatechuate oxygenase, 2,3-dihydroxybenzoate 1,2-dioxygenase, 2,3-dihydroxybenzoic oxygenase, and 2,3-dihydroxybenzoate oxygenase.  This enzyme participates in benzoate degradation via hydroxylation.

References

 

EC 1.13.11
Enzymes of unknown structure